This is a list of Royal Navy flag officers who died during the First World War.  This list includes all officers who are listed by the Commonwealth War Graves Commission (CWGC) as having died while serving during the First World War.  During this period flag officers of the Royal Navy were those who held the ranks of rear-admiral, vice-admiral, admiral or admiral of the fleet.  They typically commanded groups of sea-going vessels or held staff positions.  

The list includes 10 flag officers who died between Britain's entry into the war, 4 August 1914, and the armistice of 11 November 1918.  Listed separately are 6 who died between the armistice and 31 August 1921 which was defined by an act of British parliament as the formal end of the war.  Three flag officers were killed in action; one at the 1914 Battle of Coronel and two at the 1916 Battle of Jutland.

Ranks 
During the First World War the Royal Navy senior command consisted of flag officers of the ranks (in ascending order of seniority): rear-admiral, vice-admiral, admiral and admiral of the fleet.  Ranks could also be held in an honorary capacity, often by foreign royalty. In August 1914 there were 18 serving rear-admirals, 22 vice-admirals, 12 admirals (plus 2 honorary appointments) and 3 admirals of the fleet (plus the monarch George V and 3 honorary appointments).

In 1914 Royal Navy practice was for rear-admirals to lead divisions of 2-4 battleships, they also commanded squadrons of battlecruisers, with squadrons of smaller vessels often being commanded by commodores. These units were grouped into regional commands whose commander's rank varied depending on the importance of the region, but was usually a rear-admiral or vice-admiral.  More senior officers held command of large sea-going forces such as the Grand Fleet.   Many admirals also held staff positions on land rather than sea-going commands.  The rank of admiral of the fleet was held for life and was granted to the most senior serving naval officers or as an honorary rank for prior service.

Until 1957 the Royal Navy maintained separate branches for its officers, distinguishing the military (executive) roles from others, such as engineering, which were considered "civil" roles. The Royal Navy's engineers had previously had unique rank titles but since reforms in 1903 engineer branch officers had held the same ranks as their executive colleagues, though prefaced with "engineer".

First World War service
Royal Navy admirals served on land and at sea during the war.  In British wartime prime minister David Lloyd George's 1933 memoirs he lauds the admirals for serving at sea and sharing the risk of death with their men.  He contrasts this with the service of British generals in the war whom he generalises as châteaux generals who did not visit the battlefield.  This myth is unfair on the generals who suffered heavy casualties during the war, with many killed in action.  Three British admirals were killed in action during the war compared to at least 78 British generals with the rate of death proportionately greater in the army.  The admirals killed were Rear-Admiral Sir Christopher Cradock at the Battle of Coronel in 1914 and Rear-Admirals Sir Horace Hood and Sir Robert Arbuthnot, both killed at the Battle of Jutland in 1916.

The colonial navies (the Royal Australian Navy and Royal Canadian Navy) served in a combat capacity throughout the war, generally under the direction of the British Admiralty.  The Royal Indian Marine began the war as a non-combatant force, though during the course of the conflict its vessels were armed and served on patrol and transport duties.  The only non Royal Navy admiral of the British Empire to die during the war was the Royal Australian Navy's director of naval auxiliary services, Rear-Admiral Frederick Tickell.

Pre-armistice 
This list includes all officers noted by the Commonwealth War Graves Commission (CWGC) as holding flag officer rank and who died between the British entry into the war on 4 August 1914 and the armistice of 11 November 1918.  A large number of retired naval officers, including many admirals, volunteered for service during the war.  Many accepted commissions at lower ranks in the Royal Naval Reserve (RNR) and served in yachts and other small craft on coastal patrols.  The CWGC list these officers at their full, pre-retirement rank, even where they died whilst serving in the lower RNR rank.

Post-armistice 
The First World War is usually held to have ended with the armistice of 11 November 1918 though the peace treaties officially ending the war took some years to agree and sign. Under the Termination of the Present War (Definition) Act 1918 the end of the war was defined for general purposes by the British parliament as 31 August 1921.  This is the same date that the Commonwealth War Graves Commission uses for its casualty records.  The following flag officers died between the armistice and 31 August 1921.

Notes

See also 
List of generals of the British Empire who died during the First World War

References 

Lists of British military personnel
Lists of admirals
Lists of people killed in World War I
United Kingdom in World War I
Royal Navy admirals of World War I
Lists of Royal Navy personnel